Cyclotraxin B (CTX-B) is a small (1200 Da) cyclic peptide and highly potent, selective, non-competitive antagonist or negative allosteric modulator of TrkB (IC50  = 0.30 nM), the main receptor of brain-derived neurotrophic factor (BDNF), which itself was derived from BDNF. It crosses the blood-brain-barrier with systemic administration and produces anxiolytic-like effects in animals, though notably not antidepressant-like effects. The compound has also been found to produce analgesic effects in animal models of neuropathic pain. In addition to TrkB, CTX-B has been found to be an allosteric modulator of VEGFR2, one of the receptors of vascular endothelial growth factor (VEGF).

See also 
 Tropomyosin receptor kinase B § Antagonists

References 

Anxiolytics
Cyclic peptides
TrkB antagonists